Glad I'm in the Band is a 1969 album by the American guitarist Lonnie Mack. It is his second studio album, succeeding his debut, The Wham of that Memphis Man, from 1963. The album included two re-recorded tracks from Wham. “Why”, and the instrumental cover of Chuck Berry's "Memphis."

Track listing
All tracks composed by Lonnie Mack, except where indicated.
 "Why" 4:20
"Save Your Money" 2:48
"Old House"  (H.Bynum-G.Jones) 3.05
"Too Much Trouble"  (Drummond-Keith-Stokes) 2:02
"In the Band" (L.Mack-B.Salyer)  1:42
"Let Them Talk" (Sonny Thompson)   4:15
"Memphis"  (Chuck Berry)  2:28
"Sweat and Tears" (David Byrd)  4:14
"Roberta"  (Al Smith, John Vincent) 2:20
"Stay Away from My Baby" (Ray Pennington) 3:45
"She Don't Come Here Anymore" (Mack, Wayne Bullock) 4:24

Personnel
Lonnie Mack - guitar, vocals
Bruce Botnick - engineer
David Byrd - bass, keyboards, voices
Tim Drummond - bass
Jac Holzman - production supervisor
Maxwell Davis - horn arrangements
Mac Elsensohn - drums
Sebastian Dangerfield - voices
Billy Salyer - drums

References

1969 albums
Lonnie Mack albums
Elektra Records albums
Albums produced by Jac Holzman
Albums arranged by Maxwell Davis